Novonikolayevskoye is a rural locality (a village) in Butylitskoye Rural Settlement, Melenkovsky District, Vladimir Oblast, Russia. The population was 109 as of 2010.

Geography 
Novonikolayevskoye is located 33 km northwest of Melenki (the district's administrative centre) by road. Sovetsky is the nearest rural locality.

References 

Rural localities in Melenkovsky District